Matvey Kuzmich Kuzmin (3 August 1858 – 14 February 1942) was a Russian peasant who was killed in World War II. He was posthumously the oldest person to be named a Hero of the Soviet Union on May 8, 1965 based on his age at death.

Early life 
Kuzmin was born in 1858 in the village of Kurakino, in the Velikoluksky District (then Uezd) of Pskov Oblast. He was a self-employed farmer who declined the offer to join a kolkhoz or collective farm. He lived with his grandson and continued to hunt and fish on the territory of the kolkhoz "Rassvet" ('Dawn'). He was nicknamed "Biriuk" (lone wolf).

Malkino Heights 
Kuzmin's home region was occupied by the forces of Nazi Germany in World War II. In February 1942, he helped house a German battalion in the village of Kurakino. The German unit was ordered to pierce the Soviet defense in the area of Velikiye Luki by advancing into the rear of the Soviet troops dug in at Malkino Heights.

On February 13, 1942, the German commander asked the 83-year-old Kuzmin to guide his men and offered Kuzmin money, flour, kerosene, and a Sauer & Sohn hunting rifle.  Kuzmin agreed, but on learning of the proposed route, sent his grandson Vasilij to Pershino (6 km from Kurakino) to warn the Soviet troops and to propose an ambush near the village of Malkino. During the night, Kuzmin guided the German units through straining paths, leading them to the outskirts of Malkino at dawn. There the village defenders and the 2nd battalion of 31st Cadet Rifle Brigade of the Kalinin Front attacked. The German battalion came under heavy machine gun fire and suffered losses of about 50 killed and 20 captured. Among the chaos, a German officer had realized what had happened and turned his pistol towards Kuzmin and shot him twice. Kuzmin died during the skirmish. Three days later Kuzmin was buried with military honors. Subsequently he was reburied at the military cemetery of Velikiye Luki.

Legacy
Kuzmin's death became known through an article in Pravda, by Boris Polevoy. Polevoy was a military correspondent in that area and attended Kuzmin's funeral. In 1948 Polevoy wrote the children's story The Last Day of Matvey Kuzmin, which is still included in Russian school readings for third grade.

Kuzmin's self-sacrifice, which was compared with that of Ivan Susanin, earned him the posthumous honour of being named a Hero of the Soviet Union.

Throughout the Soviet Union, streets were named in his honour. A Soviet naval trawler was also named for him.

In 1943 a statue to him was raised in a Moscow Metro station Izmailovsky Park, now Partizanskaya, which was designed by the Soviet sculptor Matvey Manizer.

See also
 Ivan Susanin
 Toropets-Kholm Operation

References

External links
 В День всех влюбленных погиб псковский Иван Сусанин - - www.Museum.ru - at www.museum.ru
 Ships and Shipping Companies Database – WORLD SHIPPING REGISTER – Index at www.e-ships.net
 Moscow Metro / Lines & Stations / Arbatsko-Pokrovskaya line / Partizanskaya at engl.mosmetro.ru

1858 births
1942 deaths
People from Velikoluksky District
People from Velikoluksky Uyezd
Russian people of World War II
Heroes of the Soviet Union
Soviet civilians killed in World War II